Claire Adida is Professor of Political Science at the University of California, San Diego. She is on the editorial board of the American Political Science Review. She is known for research on immigration and integration, as well as use of survey experiments. She has a PhD in political science from Stanford University.

Her partner is Jennifer Burney, Associate Professor and the Marshall Saunders Chancellor's Endowed Chair in Global Climate Policy and Research at the University of California, San Diego. They have two children.

References 

French political scientists
University of California, San Diego faculty
Stanford University School of Humanities and Sciences alumni
Year of birth missing (living people)
Living people
Women political scientists
American political scientists
American LGBT scientists
21st-century LGBT people